The National Centre for Research and Restoration in French Museums (C2RMF, Centre de recherche et de restauration des musées de France) is the national research centre in France responsible for the documentation, conservation and restoration of the items held in the collections of more than 1,200 museums across France. C2RMF also carries out extensive scientific studies and data recording for these collections, and is active both nationally and internationally in the field of cultural heritage conservation and analysis. The C2RMF is involved in the development of technologies and scientific procedures employed in the preservation of art works and artefacts, both on its own and in partnership with other museums and research institutions across the globe.

The centre was established in 1998 by an arrêté (administrative decision) issued by Catherine Trautmann, the then Minister of Culture and Communications, which was gazetted in the Journal Officiel on December 30. It was created by merging the functions and facilities of two other research bodies, the Laboratoire de recherche des musées de France (LRMF, Research Laboratory of the Museums of France) and the Service de restauration des musées de France (SRMF, Restoration Service of the Museums of France) and it is organized in 4 departments. Today the center is affiliated to the CNRS with the label UMR-171.

In 2005 Mme. Christiane Naffah was appointed director of the centre by the French Minister of Culture and Communications Renaud Donnedieu de Vabres, replacing Jean-Pierre Mohen. Naffah had been a curator in France's national museums since 1977, and prior to her appointment had held positions at the Louvre, Musée du Quai Branly and had been director of the Musée de l'institut du monde arabe.
The actual director is Mme. Marie Lavandier.

Since the early 1930s, over 174,000 paintings and 34,000 objects have been individually studied or restored by the C2RMF, and its predecessor organisations LRMF and SRMF.

The C2RMF's key activities focus on the study of works of art at both a national and regional level. It undertakes investigations prior to any acquisition. Equipped with world-class experimental facilities that are constantly being improved, like the particle accelerator AGLAE, the C2RMF focuses its research on several key areas: the physical
and chemical characteristics of materials, the ageing of materials, database management, image analysis, digitisation and 3D modelling. The C2RMF is one of the most experienced centres in the world in the use of scientific techniques on art works. They have an unparalleled knowledge and experience of the current state-of-the-art in the practical capture of 3D data from many different types of artefact. The latest research has concerned the multispectral imaging of paintings, ontologies and the semantic web and the 3D modelling of objects and paintings. Furthermore, it has achieved significant results with an Open Source database management system that provides multilingual access (17 languages) to specialised vocabularies for the cultural museum sector and a semantic interface to browse the results.

References

 M. Menu (ed.), Leonardo's Technical Practice: Paintings, Drawings and Influence, Paris, 2014.
 D. Bourgarit, J. Basset, F. G. Bewer, G. Bresc-Bautier, Ph. Malgouyres et G. Scherf (eds.), French Bronze Sculpture 16th-18th Century, Londres, 2014.
 I. Biron, F. Alloteau, P. Lehuédé, O. Majérus, D. Caurant, Glass Atmospheric Alteration, Cultural Heritage, Industrial and Nuclear Glass, Paris, 2019.

Sources

External links
 Centre de recherche et de restauration des musées de France, C2RMF official website 
 Open Archives of C2RMF 
 Technè journal available on OpenEdition.org 

Research institutes in France
Museum organizations
Louvre Palace
Museums in France
1998 establishments in France
French National Centre for Scientific Research
Conservation and restoration organizations